Live Wires is the first live album of the American jazz group Yellowjackets, released in 1992. The album was recorded live at Roxy Theatre in West Hollywood, California.The album reached a peak position of number two on Billboard Top Contemporary Jazz Albums chart.

Track listing

Personnel 
Yellowjackets
 Russell Ferrante – keyboards
 Jimmy Haslip – bass
 Will Kennedy – drums
 Bob Mintzer – saxophones, bass clarinet, EWI

Guest Musicians
 Steve Croes – Synclavier
 Paulinho da Costa – percussion
 Vince Mendoza – string arrangements (7)

Guest Vocalists
 Michael Franks – lead vocals (3)
 Brenda Russell – backing vocals (3)
 Marilyn Scott – backing vocals (3)
 Take 6 – vocals (10)

Production 
 Yellowjackets – producers
 Gary Borman – executive producer 
 Mick Guzauski – chief engineer, digital mixing 
 Guy Charbonneau – remote recording engineer 
 Andrew Warwick – assistant engineer 
 Gil Morales – mix assistant 
 Bill Jackson – editing 
 Tom Nellen – editing assistant 
 Doug Sax – mastering 
 Dr. Dave – technician 
 Michael Pollard – production coordinator 
 Doreen Kalcich – assistant coordinator
 Andy Baltimore – creative director 
 David Gibb – design 
 Scott Johnson – design
 Sonny Mediana – design
 Andy Ruggirello – design
 Dan Serrano – design
 Lou Beach – illustration 
 Penny Crichton – photography

Studios
 Recorded live at The Roxy (West Hollywood, California).
 Remote recording at Le Mobile (Carlsbad, California).
 Mixed at Conway Studios (Hollywood, California).
 Edited at Sunset Sound (Hollywood, California).
 Mastered at The Mastering Lab (Hollywood, California).

Charts

References

1992 live albums
GRP Records live albums
Live instrumental albums
Yellowjackets albums